The 2020–21 Serbian Cup season is the fifteenth season of the Serbian national football cup competition. It started on 9 September 2020, and will end on 25 May 2021.

Calendar

Preliminary round
A preliminary round was held in order to reduce the number of teams competing in the first round to 32. It consisted of 5 single-legged ties, with a penalty shoot-out as the decider if the score was tied after 90 minutes.

Round of 32
Draw for the first round took place on 2 October 2020. Matches were played on 20 October and 21 October 2020, with exception of match including Red Star and Zlatibor which was played on 16 November due to Red Star's European fixtures.

Round of 16
The 16 winners from first round took part in this stage of the competition. The draw was held on 17 November 2020, and it contained seeded and unseeded teams. The seeds were determined by last season's final standings in the Serbian top divisions. Matches were played on 25 and 26 November 2020, with exception of match including Rad and Red Star that was postponed to 18 December 2020 due to Red Star's European fixtures.

Quarter-finals

Semi-finals

Final

Top goalscorers
As of matches played on 11 March 2021.

Notes

References

External links
 Official site

Serbian Cup seasons
Cup
Serbian Cup